Polk County is a county in the U.S. state of Nebraska. As of the 2020 United States Census, the population was 5,214. Its county seat is Osceola. The county was formed in 1856, and was organized in 1870. It was named for President James K. Polk.

In the Nebraska license plate system, Polk County is represented by the prefix 41 (it had the 41st-largest number of vehicles registered in the county when the license plate system was established in 1922).

Geography
The Platte River flows northeastward along the northwest boundary of Polk County. The lower portion of the county is drained by a local drainage, flowing east and east-northeastward into Butler County. The county terrain consists of rolling hills, dropping off to the river valley in the northern portion, and sloped to the east-southeast in the lower portion of the county. The county terrain is largely devoted to agriculture.

Major highways

  U.S. Highway 81
  Nebraska Highway 39
  Nebraska Highway 66
  Nebraska Highway 69
  Nebraska Highway 92

Adjacent counties

 Butler County – east
 Seward County – southeast
 York County – south
 Hamilton County – southwest
 Merrick County – west
 Platte County – north

Demographics

As of the 2000 United States Census, there were 5,639 people, 2,259 households, and 1,570 families in the county. The population density was 5/km2 (13/mi2). There were 2,717 housing units at an average density of 2/km2 (6/mi2). The racial makeup of the county was 98.92% White, 0.02% Black or African American, 0.28% Native American, 0.09% Asian, 0.28% from other races, and 0.41% from two or more races. 1.08% of the population were Hispanic or Latino of any race.

There were 2,259 households, out of which 29.90% had children under the age of 18 living with them, 62.90% were married couples living together, 4.10% had a female householder with no husband present, and 30.50% were non-families. 27.60% of all households were made up of individuals, and 15.40% had someone living alone who was 65 years of age or older. The average household size was 2.43 and the average family size was 2.97.

The county population contained 25.10% under the age of 18, 6.00% from 18 to 24, 24.40% from 25 to 44, 23.10% from 45 to 64, and 21.40% who were 65 years of age or older. The median age was 42 years. For every 100 females there were 100.50 males. For every 100 females age 18 and over, there were 95.70 males.

The median income for a household in the county was $37,819, and the median income for a family was $45,081. Males had a median income of $30,286 versus $19,595 for females. The per capita income for the county was $17,934. About 4.40% of families and 5.80% of the population were below the poverty line, including 7.20% of those under age 18 and 4.70% of those age 65 or over.

Communities

Cities
 Osceola (county seat)
 Stromsburg

Villages
 Polk
 Shelby

Unincorporated communities
 Durant
 Swedehome or Swede Home

Townships

 Canada
 Clear Creek
 Hackberry
 Island
 Osceola
 Platte
 Pleasant Home
 Stromsburg
 Valley

Politics
Polk County voters have been reliably Republican for several decades. In only one national election since 1936 has the county selected the Democratic Party candidate (as of 2020).

See also
 National Register of Historic Places listings in Polk County, Nebraska

References

 
1870 establishments in Nebraska
Populated places established in 1870